Geology Today is a bimonthly peer-reviewed scientific journal published by  Wiley on behalf of the Geologists' Association and the Geological Society of London. The editor-in-chief is Peter Doyle (Geological Society of London). The journal covers all aspects of the Earth sciences.

Abstracting and indexing
The journal is abstracted and indexed in Aquatic Sciences and Fisheries Abstracts, EBSCO databases, ProQuest databases, Scopus, and The Zoological Record.

References

External links

Geology journals
Wiley (publisher) academic journals
Geological Society of London academic journals
Publications established in 1985
Geologists' Association
1985 establishments in the United Kingdom